Fortitude Valley (often called "The Valley" by local residents) is an inner suburb of the City of Brisbane, the state capital of Queensland, Australia. The suburb features two pedestrian malls at Brunswick Street Mall and Chinatown, and is one of the hubs of Brisbane's nightlife, renowned for its nightclubs, bars and adult entertainment.

Geography
Fortitude Valley is built upon a low-lying marshy flat, immediately northeast of the Brisbane central business district.

History

Originally inhabited by the Meanjin peoples of the Turrbal and Jagera/Yuggera Indigenous groups. Later on, Scottish immigrants from the ship  arrived in Brisbane in 1849 in hopes to take the land, enticed by Rev Dr John Dunmore Lang on the promise of free land grants. Denied land, the immigrants set up camp in York's Hollow waterholes in the vicinity of today's Victoria Park, Herston, Queensland. A number of the immigrants moved on and settled the suburb, naming it after the ship on which they arrived.

Fortitude Valley National School opened on 4 March 1861 in a hall attached to the Foresters' Arms Hotel near the corner of Ann and Brunswick Streets, diagonally opposite the Royal George Hotel. The first purpose-built school opened at 95 Brookes Street on 12 August 1867. In 1874 an additional building was erected at 99 Brookes Street and the school was split into two separate departments - Fortitude Valley Boys' State School, and Fortitude Valley Girls' and Infants' State School. The year 1887 witnessed the opening of a further new school building for boys at 85 Brookes Street and in 1888 the Girls' and Infants' School was split again to create Fortitude Valley Girls' State School, and Fortitude Valley Infants' State School. In 1950 the Boys' and the Girls' campuses were amalgamated as the Fortitude Valley State School on the site of the former 1887 boys' school which was demolished in 1948/49. In 1951, the Infants' School merged with the Fortitude Valley State School. The school closed in December 2013 due to low student numbers, despite a prolonged campaign by parents and students to keep it open. However, it was reopened in January 2020 as Fortitude Valley State Secondary College in response to a growing population in the area. It was Brisbane's first new inner city school in more than 50 years, built vertically to fit in with the increased population density of the suburb.

A Primitive Methodist church opened in October 1861 in Windmill Street (now McLachlan Street).

All Hallows' School opened on 1 November 1861 by the Sisters of Mercy in the Dean's Cottage beside the Catholic Cathedral (now Old St Stephen's Church) in Adelaide Street in the Brisbane town centre. It was the first secondary school for girls in Queensland. Needing more space to accommodate a growing school they moved on 1 November 1863 to the house Adderton on Duncan's Hill in Fortitude Valley.

In 1862 the Jireh Baptist Church opened in Fortitude Valley.

A Primitive Methodist church opened at 483 Brunswick Street on Sunday 15 October 1876.

A post office was established in 1887.

St Patrick's Catholic Church was built in Wickham Street by Father James Hanly, uphill from the Prince Consort Hotel. St Patrick's Convent School was established later at the Wickham Street site. Both were wooden structures. In 1882, the congregation moved to a new (and still current) St Patrick's Church in Morgan Street. On 5 December 1887, Cardinal Moran laid the foundation stone for a new school building in Ivory Street opening onto Hope Street at the rear. The new school opened on January 1889. In 1952 Brisbane City Council announced that it would be undertaking work in Ivory Street as part of a solution to eliminate traffic bottlenecks and St Patrick's School was one of the affected properties. In 1955 the school buildings were relocated to the church grounds in Morgan Street. The school closed on 19 November 1982.

1891 saw the train line extended from the Brisbane central business district (the area around Queen Street) into Fortitude Valley, and Thomas Beirne opened a business on Brunswick Street. His business thrived and, after extension, he travelled to England in 1896, leaving his manager of two years, James McWhirter, in charge. Soon after his return, McWhirter established a competing drapery business opposite Beirne's in 1898. Beirne and McWhirter became keen rivals and are credited with establishing the Valley as a hub of commerce from the late 1890s.

In the late 19th century, commercial activities in Brisbane were divided along religious lines, with Protestant shopkeepers setting up along Queen and Adelaide Streets in the central business district, and shops operated by Roman Catholics in Stanley Street, South Brisbane. However, in the 1893 Brisbane flood (and again in 1897), major floods wiped out many shops in South Brisbane, and owners in that area decided to move and set up operations north of the river in an area free of flooding. The area they chose was Fortitude Valley. By that time Brisbane's horse-drawn tram system already centred on Fortitude Valley, making it the logical choice to establish a shopping precinct.

Fortitude Valley was also strongly advocated as the location of a new town hall in what became known as "the battle of the sites". Brisbane Town Council already purchased a piece of land in Fortitude Valley and supporters of the Fortitude Valley site pointed out that it would allow stronger foundations compared to the swampy site proposed at Adelaide Street in the existing commercial district. However, a petition was raised in support of the Adelaide Street site and with the support of Charles Moffatt Jenkinson, the mayor of Brisbane in 1914, it was chosen over the Fortitude Valley site. Jenkinson committed the council to that decision by selling the site in Fortitude Valley to the Catholic Church for the construction of the Holy Name Cathedral (a project that, although commenced, made little progress and was eventually abandoned).

From the early 1900s through to the 1960s, the thriving shopping precinct was dominated by McWhirters, Beirne's and, later, Overells' department stores. The Overells Building was completed in 1907. They were ultimately bought out by the Myer, David Jones and Waltons chains respectively with Overells being bought by Walton in 1956. Woolworths and Coles supermarkets and a host of smaller shops also flourished in the precinct during this period. Owing to its proximity to the central business district and the close concentration of public transport in the area, the Valley became the largest non-CBD shopping precinct in Australia through the 1950s and 1960s.

Between 1923 and 1948 mixed gender opportunity classes for the intellectually impaired and handicapped were conducted at the boys' school. In 1951 the Fortitude Valley Opportunity School was approved and operated as a separate entity in its own right shortly afterwards. The school closed in 1961.

The rise of suburban shopping centres and the closure of the tram network in 1969 sounded the death knell for Fortitude Valley, with a gradual decrease in customers. David Jones closed its Valley store in the 1970s and Myer closed its doors in the early 1990s.

In 2010 the Music Industry College opened at 458 Wickham Street with 27 students. In 2014 the college relocated to its own premises at 38 Berwick Street.

In 2017 the Angelorum College opened at 377 St Pauls Terrace as an independent Catholic school, established by families who had previously been home schooling their children.

Demographics

The median age of the Fortitude Valley population was 31 years, 7 years below the Australian median. Children aged under 15 years made up 4.3% of the population and people aged 65 years and over made up 4.7% of the population. 46.1% of people living in Fortitude Valley were born in Australia, compared to the national average of 66.7; the next most common countries of birth were India 4.4%, New Zealand 4.2%, England 3.2%, Brazil 2.4% and Colombia 2.2%. 65.1% of people spoke only English at home; the next most popular languages were Spanish 3.5%, Mandarin 2.7%, Portuguese 2.3%, Hindi 1.8% and Korean 1.8%. The most common responses for religion were No Religion 40.8% and Catholic 18.0%.

Heritage listings 

Fortitude Valley has a number of heritage-listed sites, including:

 112 Alfred Street: Fortitude Valley Child Health Centre
 501 Ann Street: Queensland Brewery Company Building
 547 Ann Street: All Hallows' School Buildings
 740 Ann Street: former Fortitude Valley Post Office
 33 Arthur Street: Doggetts Cottage
 Boundary Street: Howard Smith Wharves
 95 Boundary Street: Austral Motors Building
 Bradfield Highway: Story Bridge
 95 & 99 Brookes Street: Fortitude Valley State School including the former Fortitude Valley Infants' School and former Fortitude Valley Boys' School
 116–120 Brookes Street: Fortitude Valley Methodist Church
 119 Brookes Street: Fortitude Valley Police Station
 141 Brookes Street: Holy Trinity Church
 141 Brookes Street: Holy Trinity Parish Hall
 141 Brookes Street: Holy Trinity Rectory
 323–335 Brunswick Street: Royal George Hotel and Ruddle's Building
 339 Brunswick Street: Empire Hotel
 446–452 Brunswick Street: former Corbett and Son Store
 483 Brunswick Street: Fortitude Valley Primitive Methodist Church
 517 Brunswick Street: La Scala
 28 Duncan Street: TC Beirne Department Store
 Gipps Street: Holy Name Cathedral Site
 9 McLachlan Street: Bulolo Flats
 58 Morgan Street: St Patricks Church
 167–173 St Paul's Terrace: Villa Maria Hostel
 464–468 St Paul's Terrace: Jubilee Hotel
 342 Water Street: Drill Shed
 Wickham Street: McWhirters
 85 Wickham Street: Centenary Place
 230 Wickham Street: Prince Consort Hotel
 308 Wickham Street: Wickham Hotel
 620 Wickham Street: West's Furniture Showroom

Entertainment district

Chinatown

The Chinatown Mall is a pedestrian street which occupies all of Duncan Street opened in 1987 as the first step to the revitalisation of Fortitudes Valley's entertainment district. The Mall runs parallel to Brunswick Street Mall, and connects Wickham Street and Ann Street.

The 1990s saw the development of Fortitude Valley into a thriving live music scene and nightclub district. In 1991, the Brunswick Street pedestrian shopping mall was established. Thereafter, the Brisbane City Council led a concerted urban renewal campaign, encouraging high density residential development around the suburb.

In 2012, around 50,000 people head to Fortitude Valley's clubs, pubs and restaurants each weekend night. Around 30 venues are licensed to trade until 3:00 am.

Valley Music Harmony Plan
In 1999, residents' complaints about neighbouring clubs' live music threatened the closure of the Empire Hotel and the Press Club, two established venues. Musicians and their fans revolted through the "Save the Music" campaign and, 20,000 signatures later, petitioned Brisbane City Council and the Queensland Government to address the emerging problem. The Brisbane City Council commenced the development of a Valley Music Harmony Plan in July 2002. The aim of the Valley Music Harmony Plan is to manage the impacts of music noise on residents and businesses without compromising the viability of the entertainment industry in Fortitude Valley.

That resulted in 2005 in Fortitude Valley becoming Australia's first "Special Entertainment Precinct", designed to protect both live music and new residents through planning restrictions. The Special Entertainment Precinct status exempts entertainment venues within the area from the amplified noise requirements of the Liquor Act 1992, and allows council to manage amplified music noise under the Amplified Music Venues Local Law 2006. But it also requires new residential and accommodation development construction to achieve a minimum noise reduction of 25 decibels in the 63 hertz frequency band.

Drink Safe Precinct
The Fortitude Valley Drink Safe Precinct was a two-year-long trial starting in December 2010. Trials also took place in Surfers Paradise and Townsville. After one year club owners responded positively to the trial. Statistics released in May 2012 showed arrests, evictions and tickets for liquor infringements have declined.

Birdees 
Birdees (commonly referred to as 'The Bird' in advertising) is an entertainment venue catering to students and backpackers.

The Zoo 
Fortitude Valley had become a veritable ghost town, sidelined after the tram network shut down in 1969 and falling into decay after the criminal gangs and corrupt police were forced out following the Fitzgerald Inquiry. Gone were all major department stores, brothels and illegal casinos, left behind were boarded-up shops and empty warehouses. Fortitude Valley was earmarked for an urban renewal project by the city council. Into this social and economic climate, enterprisingto take advantage of Fortitude Valley’s cheap rents and tap into the federal government’s NEIS (New Enterprise Incentive Scheme) program aimed at helping unemployed people start a new business. Joc Curran, 25, and her friend C. Smith, 23, used the $5,000 to open a new venue in an upstairs warehouse space on Ann Street, not far from iconic gay nightclub, The Beat. Curran and Smith had the dream to build a live music venue that celebrated independent music, art and creativity. Despite humble beginnings, The Zoo appeared at the perfect time, in the perfect place, to deliver on its core mission of nurturing young local talent. It went on to host many local, national and international bands and musicians, who would often perform ‘secret gigs’ when in town such as the legendary night in 1996 Nick Cave joined the Dirty Three onstage, or when The Pixies did an intimate warm-up show before headlining Splendour in the Grass in 2010. Just as importantly, it nurtured almost every Brisbane band to make it to the national stage. The Zoo was that kind of place – warm, open, welcoming. It changed the musical landscape of Brisbane, and Australia by association, at the vanguard of The Valley’s renaissance as the live music heart of Brisbane.

Transport

Brisbane Transport operates buses to, from and through Fortitude Valley. Fortitude Valley railway station serves all suburban and interurban lines, including Airport line service to Brisbane Airport. The station has four platforms and is located in Zone 1 of the TransLink integrated public transport system.

Taxis
Secure taxi ranks to enable patrons to catch a taxi home are set up at various strategic points and enable easy access without the need to hail a cab. Fortitude Valley has five locations with these ranks on Friday and Saturday night. Funding for this free service is provided by the Brisbane City Council, the Queensland State Government and the Taxi Council of Queensland. These secure ranks are staffed by taxi supervisors and security guards to ensure commuters an orderly and safe environment whilst they wait for service. A 'Chaplain' service also operates where some people might be suffering the effects of excess drugs or alcohol and need some care and attention in a safe place rather than on a bench or footpath. The combination of these services have reputedly assisted in reducing the incidents of fights, disputes and arrests especially between the hours of midnight and 5 am on weekends.

Speed limits
On 24 August 2007, a  speed limit was introduced to parts of Wickham Street, Ann Street, McLachlan Street and Warner Street. The speed limit applies between 10 pm and 6 am from Friday to Sunday night. The speed limit was introduced following safety audits of the Fortitude Valley identifying pedestrian-vehicle conflict as a major issue.

James Street Precinct 
Fortitude Valley's James Street is a retail and lifestyle precinct, beaming with lush tropical tree coverage and vines. While redeveloped and repurposed, Fortitude Valley's James Street precinct pays homage to its industrial past, while also celebrating contemporary Brisbane. The neighbourhood is home to a range of cafes, restaurants, boutique stores, luxury hotels, and James Street Palace Cinemas. The Calile Hotel is situated on James Street, and houses boutique stores and restaurants. James Street's designer and retail stores include, but are not limited to, Zimmerman, Camilla and Marc, Dion Lee, Bassike; and retailers like Coco Republic, Pottery Barn, Pottery Barn Kids, West Elm, Matt Blatt, Space Furniture, Winning Appliances, Nick Scali Furniture, and Everyday Living.The precinct also has a number of luxury car dealerships like Tesla, Inc., BMW Brisbane, Mercedes-Benz Fortitude Valley, Lexus, and Volvo.

Education 
Angelorum College is a private primary and secondary (Prep-9) school for boys and girls at 377 St Pauls Terrace. In 2017, the school had an enrolment of 35 students with 4 teachers and 3 non-teaching staff (2 full-time equivalent).

Music Industry College is a private secondary (11-12) school for boys and girls at 38-42 Berwick Street. In 2017, the school had an enrolment of 80 students with 7 teachers (5 full-time equivalent) and 6 non-teaching staff (4 full-time equivalent).

Humanitas High School is a private secondary school (Years 7 to 12), run as a democratic community school with full input from parents, teachers and students. It opened in July 2021 and in 2023 catered to caters to 40 students in Years 7 to 9. 

There is one government High School in the Valley - Fortitude Valley State Secondary College.  This school was opened in 2020 on the same grounds as the old Fortitude Valley State Primary School.  The nearest government primary schools are Brisbane Central State School (in Spring Hill) and New Farm State School (in New Farm).

All Hallows' School is a Catholic faith based private school in Fortitude Valley. It is said to be Queensland's oldest secondary school.

There were no government secondary schools in Fortitude Valley (the nearest was Kelvin Grove State College) until the start of 2020 when the new Fortitude Valley State Secondary College opened.

Local events and culture

Valley Fiesta
The Valley Fiesta is an annual three-day event featuring free live music, market stalls, food and drink from many local restaurants and cafés, and other entertainment. Artists that have performed at the Valley Fiesta include Hilltop Hoods, Downsyde, Katie Noonan, Tim Rogers, Butterfingers, Evermore and The Preatures on the Brunswick Street Mall stage and Nick Skitz and End Of Fashion at surrounding venues.

International Jazz Festival
The International Jazz Festival replaced the biennial Valley Jazz Festival in 2013. The festival is put on by Jazz Queensland. It is 5 five day festival generally held during the first week of June.

Straight Out of Brisbane (SOOB)
Straight Out of Brisbane was formed in 2002 by a group of emerging artists who wanted to create new opportunities in Queensland's independent cultural sector. The festival is not-for-profit artist-run event that features workshops, performances, exhibitions, screenings, live music and public art. The festival has been held every year up until 2007.

Fortitude Valley Diehards
Fortitude Valley Football Club, also simply known as "Valleys", were the oldest surviving rugby league team in Brisbane until their demise in 1995. In 2002, Valleys entered a partnership with another former Brisbane rugby league team, Brothers. Playing under the name Brothers-Valleys until changing their name to Brothers Diehards for the 2004 season. Valley's Juniors are still active members of the QRL South East Division having been based at Emerson Park in Grange since the 1970s.

Big Gay Day
Big Gay Day is a gay, lesbian, bisexual and transgender pride festival held over one day in and around the Wickham Hotel in Fortitude Valley. The celebration raises money for LGBTQIA+ groups such as GLWA and Open Doors. Previous entertainment has included various local and international DJ's, performers such as Marcia Hines, Operator Please and TV Rock as well as drag shows.

Swimming
The Commercial Swimming Club trains at the Valley Pool and has produced many Olympic and World Champions.

Amenities 
There are a number of parks, including:

 Bedford Playground Park
 Brunswick Street Park

 Centenary Place Park

 Church Street Park

 Howard Smith Wharf Precinct

 Morse St Park

 Wilson Outlook Reserve

Notable people
 Edward Archibald Douglas (1877–1947)
 Born on 2 November and attended St. Benedict's College, Fort Augustas
 Appointed judge of the Industrial Court of Queensland in 1915 by T. J. Ryan's Labor Government
 Appointed Supreme Court Judge in 1929 until his death in 1947 from a coronary occlusion
 Harriette Martha Voss (1887–1951)
 Born on 10 October and attended Brisbane Girls Grammar School and the University of Sydney
 Appointed resident medical officer upon graduation and in March 1915 she was appointed Chief R.M.O.
 In 1948, Voss became the manager of Hillcrest Hospital but was forced to resign in 1951 due to ill health
 She died on 20 December later that year with her final wish of Hillcrest Hospital being attained by St. Andrew's Presbyterian Church
 Charles Edward Chuter (1880–1948)
 Born 11 March, Chuter attended Fortitude Valley Primary School and later on Brisbane Grammar School on scholarship
 July 1898, he joined the Home Secretary's Department as clerk until 1922 when he was prompter assistant under-secretary of the Home Secretary's Department
 Chuter retired 31 December 1947 and passed from a coronary occlusion 31 January 1948

See also

 Mana Bar

References

External links

 

 Valley Fiesta
 Valley Jazz Festival
 A childcare centre closes in the Valley: A history of "Practical Sympathy" – John Oxley Library, State Library of Queensland
 The Zoo turns 30! (A brief history of Gen X in Brisbane)

 
Red-light districts in Australia
Gay villages in Australia
Entertainment districts in Australia
1887 establishments in Australia
Populated places established in 1887
LGBT culture in Brisbane
Pre-Separation Queensland